Montigyra is a monotypic genus of stony coral which is a type of coral that lives on the seabed and builds a hard skeleton. It is represented by a single species, Montigyra kenti. Like all coral, this one is composed of animals called polyps, and the polyps of this species are large compared to those of other coral.

Description

It has a hemispherical and submeandroid skeleton with groups of septa fused into monticules or hydnophores, a trait typically attributed to Hydnophora. Its septae are thin and compact.

Distribution & habitat
Its habitat is not recorded. The genus Montigyra and species Montigyra kenti are both described from a single specimen found in northwest Australia. It was collected in turbid water.

References 

Scleractinia genera
Monotypic cnidarian genera
Euphylliidae